Esatpaşa is a neighborhood in the municipality of Ataşehir on the Asian side of Istanbul. It is bounded on the north by the Cumhuriyet neighborhood of Üsküdar, on the east by the Aşık Veysel neighborhood of Ataşehir, on the south and west by the Örnek neighborhood of Ataşehir, and on the west by the Fetih neighborhood of Ataşehir. 

The neighborhood is in the location of the former Esatpaşa Çiftliği (Esatpaşa Farm), which was named for Esat Paşa, an Ottoman general.

The neighborhood was organized in 1969 and includes three high schools, two primary schools, three mosques, and ten parks.

References

External links
İstanbul Şehir Rehberi. URL: http://sehirrehberi.ibb.gov.tr  

Neighbourhoods of Ataşehir